is the main antagonist of the 2009 film Mega Monster Battle: Ultra Galaxy, and has made subsequent appearances in the Ultra Series.

He was originally an Ultra Warrior of the Land of Light, but his proud nature caused him to try and harness the power of the Land of Light's power source, the Plasma Spark, which led to his banishment and transformation into his current monstrous state after being merged with Alien Raybrad. He was imprisoned by Ultraman King for attempting to invade the Land of Light, but was eventually freed by Alien Zarab many years later and defeated by Ultraman Zero. Ever since then, the two have been archenemies, constantly clashing should they cross paths. Uniquely among other evil Ultras, Belial is the first whose origin is from the Land of Light, like most of the Showa Ultras. In Ultraman Geed, Belial was revealed to have fathered the series namesake Ultraman, who was born from his own genetic material.

In Mega Monster Battle: Ultra Galaxy and Revenge of Belial, Ultraman Belial was voiced by comedian  of the manzai duo Ameagari Kesshitai.

Character conception
Belial is designed by Masayuki Gotou and Junya Okabe, who used a shark as his motif basis. As for his movements, this was instructed by the director Koichi Sakamoto. Belial's suit was simultaneously made with Ultraman Zero, based on wetsuits with the materials shaped in a three-dimensional appearance. As a result, his body pattern is three-dimensional instead of coloured. The element of wire fu is also included in Belial's actions, and thus two wires were used: up and action. Although the mask was originally moulded integrally with the head, Belial and Zero were structured out of plane. In the original plan, the mask was supposed to have a mouth-opening mechanism but this was removed to better fit the suit actor. In hopes of emphasizing the concept of "evil Ultraman", his body posture and neck hunch forward.

In Ultraman Geed, Koichi Sakamoto regarded the season as Ultraman Belial's final chapter from his first appearance in Mega Monster Battle: Ultra Galaxy and is also his first time fighting on Earth. Writer Otsuichi decided to tone down his chimpira-esque trait towards one that is worthy of an evil emperor.

Other forms are as follows:
Early Style: Belial's original form prior to his corruption, this suit was made by modifying Ultraman Zearth's.
Belyudra: The gigantic chimera monster Belial constructs and 'pilots', made from the inhabitants of the Monster Graveyard. Initially assumed to be CGI, an actual suit was made. The suit is moving one by one to the head, torso, right arm and left arm. After creating a three-dimensional mould, the suit was fully materialised through 3D printing.
Kaiser Belial: The design drawing is based on a photo of Belial's suit. The original draft was meant for Belial to wear a set of armour but due to the lack of improvement, it was reduced to face scar and mantle. Kaiser Belial's suit was modified from the original Belial, where it received new mask and the neck portion modified to better fit the mantle. Under request of director Yuichi Abe, the claws are elongated, forming Kaiser Belial Claws. Suit actor Hiroshi Suenaga mentions that Belial is supposedly to have the calmness of an emperor in contrast to his brutish trait from the last movie. He also complains on how he struggled wearing the Belial Mantle due to weighing about 10 kg.
Arch Belial: It was labelled as  during the initial concept. Since the antagonist characters are all robots and humanoid, a monstrous character was proposed. The staffs have troubles in maintaining the suit due to its fragile structure as a result of deciding its appearance late. The design aims to unify the image of Belial by retaining the colouring pattern. Much decoration was made so that its image would not be compared to final villains of past Ultra Series. His designer likewise is also Masayuki Gotou, who previously did for the original Belial and was manufactured by Light Sculpture Studios.
Zero Darkness: This form (or rather, possession) uses the body shape of Ultraman Zero augmented with Belial's colourings.
Chimeraberus: Masayuki designed it to not resemble any of the Monster Capsule component it uses (Zog and Five King), but instead a simplified version of Belyudra. As a differentiation from Arch Belial, Koichi Sakamoto proposes a half-man/beast hybrid themed monster and he also implemented its ability to absorb Ultraman Geed as a frame by frame replication of Alien Rayblood's assimilation with Belial from Mega Monster Battle: Ultra Galaxy.
Ultraman Belial Atrocious: Based on the early design of Ultraman Geed, Masayuki chooses a stylish appearance that is closer to normal Ultras, rather than Belial's original hunching position and the skeleton-like detail is designed with three dimensional parts. Instead of grotesque monster forms like Ultraman X and Ultraman Orb proposed, Atrocious was given as a conflict between two Ultras. His fight with Geed on a night scene in episode 25 took cues from that of the heroic Ultra and Skull Gomora from the first episode.

Naming

His name, Belial, is a reference to the similarly named devil in the Judaism and Christianity religions.

History

Past
Tens of thousand years prior, Belial was a powerful Ultra Warrior and a friend to Father and Mother of Ultra in their younger age. After participating in the Great Ultra War, Belial saw inspiration in Alien Empera's army and grew envious to the Father of Ultra's election as the Supreme Commander, winning Marie's heart and surpassing the former in terms of strength. This jealously tempted Belial to steal energy from the Plasma Spark in hopes of obtaining greater power, only for the energies to inflict him pain in the attempt as he was banished soon after for his selfish act of endangering Planet Ultra. It was then that Belial encounters the spirit of Alien Rayblood, who further corrupted Belial by forcefully entering the Ultraman's body and transforming him.

Mega Monster Battle: Ultra Galaxy

During the events of Ultra Galaxy, Belial was freed by Alien Zarab, who assumed they can form an alliance before his liberator killed him. Belial fought his way through the numerous Ultramen in the Land of Light to successfully steal the Plasma Spark, turning his homeworld into a frozen wasteland. Belial uses the Plasma Spark's power to revive the Monster Graveyard's residents before being challenged by Ultraman, Ultraseven, and Ultraman Mebius, who brought the Human Reinoics Rei for additional aid. But Belial, learning of their ties as Reinoics, corrupts Rei to attack his comrades until his ZAP Spacy teammates restore his senses. All seemed lost until Ultraman Zero appears and avenges his father Ultraseven by effortlessly defeating the remnants of Belial's army and then Belial himself. But Belial summons the souls of the Monster Graveyard's monsters to join with him to create the gigantic Belyudra with the evil Ultraman as its brain. Belial has Belyudra overpower everyone present until Rei uses hijacked the Giga Battle Nizer to take control of the composing the monsters, leaving Belial as Zero apparently kills him while the others destroy Belyudra. But as the Plasma Spark is restored, it would be revealed that Belial survived.

In the English dub, Belial is voiced by Beau Rue Marie.

Ultraman Zero: The Revenge of Belial
Following his defeat at the Monster Graveyard, gaining a large scar from Zero's attempted death blow, Belial established the Belial Galactic Empire under the name Kaiser Belial. His forces based in the hand-like Malebrandes space station, Belial led his army to conquer the planet Esmeralda in another universe to usurp its supplies of emeralds. During that invasion, Belial drove off all resistances while corrupting Esmeralda's protector Mirror Knight and had the whole planet chained to his base, Malebrandes. He also send the mass-produced army of Darklopses, robots based on Zero's specs, to invade Planet Ultra before they are destroyed by the Space Garrison.

When Zero (in his human host Run) was captured by Iaron, Belial had his rival imprisoned in his command center and forced him to watch his homeworld invaded while holding his Ultra Zero Eye before Mirror Knight freed him. When Zero regained his Ultraman form, Belial absorbed all of the emeralds he harvested to become Arch Belial, successfully overpowering Zero and holding off against the resistant forces. Setting his sight on Planet Esmeralda, Belial prepared to destroy the planet, but not before Zero and his allies formed an energy shield and died from exhaustion. It was then that the hopes from the resistance brought forth the Shield of Baraj, which transformed into the Ultimate Aegis and for Ultraman Noa to revive Zero. Transforming into Ultimate Zero, the rest of his comrades delay Belial long enough for him to deliver the finishing blow, successfully killing him in the process.

In the English dub, he is voiced by Kyle Rea.

Ultra Zero Fight
Ultraman Belial's spirit soon made his way to the Monster Graveyard and possessed Armored Darkness, forming another army called the Darkness Five, consisting of five evil aliens whose races had fought the Ultra Warriors before. After successfully rescuing Pygmon and defeating Sly of the Dark Magic, Zero soon met Armored Darkness, then revealed to be housing Belial and re-dubbed as Kaizer Darkness, fully healed to the point that his previous scar had vanished. When the two archenemies clashed once more, Zero managed to deliver a killing blow, but this was a part of Belial's plan to possess his rival and be reborn as Zero Darkness, using Ultraman Zero's own power to assassinate the Ultimate Force Zero. With victory in his grasp, Belial was about to lead the Darkness Five in a conquest of the whole universe but while attempting to kill a helpless Pygmon, it was then that Zero regained control. Lashing Belial for not being a true Ultra Warrior, Zero expelled the evil Ultra from his body. Revealing a new form, Shining Zero, the gilded warrior reversed time in the immediate area to undo all the damage done by Belial and revived his fallen friends. The Darkness Five soon retreated, but because of Shining Zero, Belial was also revived. Belial resorted to make himself stronger as he led the Darkness Five.

Subsequent history
Ultraman Retsuden (2011-2013): Belial and the Darkness Five appeared during the 100th episode anniversary of Ultraman Retsuden, hijacking the television program from Ultraman Zero. As a commemoration, Belial tried to narrate all 100 monsters that make up the fusion of Beryudora but because of the time limit, he could only narrate 13 monsters, lashing out at the series for having a short running time. In a similar fashion to Zero, Belial acted as the straight man, often clashing with Glocken of the Freezing in a manner similar to a manzai. In the 103rd episode, after narrating the episode, Belial took his leave, noting how Zero became stronger due to his desire to protect the weak, resolving to find something that he can protect to become stronger.
Shin Ultraman Retsuden (2013-2016): Belial made his only appearance in episode 49. Upon his arrival and Jathar's return to the Darkness Five, they decided to invade the world of Plasma Soul. This episode marked the promotion for Ultraman Belial and the Darkness Five's availability as playable characters in the digital card game, Mega Monster Rush: Ultra Frontier. During their invasion, the team appeared in a manner of 3D animation.
Ultra Zone (2011): Belyudra appeared in the late night show of the Ultra Series in the second episode as part of a Mansai duo with Giga Khimaira. Later on, it was featured in one of the show's eye catch by decorating the Tokyo Tower a la Christmas tree.
Ultraman Ginga S: Showdown! Ultra 10 Warriors!! Facing Ultraman Zero, the two fought in an intense battle before Zero used his Mode Changes and finished Belial with Shining Zero's Shining Emerium Slash.
Ultraman Orb (2016): An Ultra Fusion Card of Ultraman Belial was originally in possession of Alien Mefilas Nostra. Juggler unsealed Maga-Orochi through Ultraman Belial's card, destroying Zoffy's card in turn and eventually given to Gai/Ultraman Orb alongside Zoffy's card by Tamayura. While Gai has no problems with Zoffy, he was never able to call out Belial's power due to the card's refusal, but Tamayura's sacrifice allowed Gai to use the card in full anger and gave birth to his new form, Thunder Breastar, therefore defeating Maga-Orochi. Usage of this form, however, puts his mind into the state of a berserk, which almost cost the life of Naomi, Gai's friend and caretaker when he faced the robot Galactron which put her life as a hostage. It was not until Gai started to be confident in his powers, not only being able to control the form but also regaining Orb Origin. During the final episode of the series, Belial and the other Ultra Fusion Cards in Gai's possession transform into physical projections of themselves to assist Ultraman Orb in delivering the finishing blow on Magata no Orochi, while Juggler held off the monster long enough to expose its weak spot. In episode 25, he is portrayed by suit actor .
Ultra Fight Orb (2017): Reibatos, a fellow Reionics, tried to revive Belial's original legacy by recreating the Giga Battle Nizer. After surviving Orb's attacks, he tried to revive Belial as a final act of revenge. But Reibatos finds out that the spell is not working and realizes that the evil Ultraman is already alive as Belial, initially appearing as Geed in his Primitive form. Belial quickly killed Reibatos and reclaimed his weapon.

Ultraman Geed
But through Ultraman King's intervention, the universe was restored with Belial reduced to an incorporeal state as he takes refuge in a dimensional tear while entrusting the Alien Sturm Kei Fukuide to steal the Ultra Capsules and Risers from Planet Ultra to orchestrate his restoration. To that end, Kei created the Nebula House and used a sample of Belial's DNA to create Riku Asakura as the Sturm's pawn.

19 years later, their plan were put into motion as they orchestrate Riku's transformation into Ultraman Geed (destroying his house and leaving behind a set of Ultra Capsules (among them being the  - his own power) and a Riser) and had him collect the Ultra Capsules in hopes of restoring Belial's corporeal form. He also had Kei play the role of the monsters by providing him means of transforming into , a classification of chimeric monsters who bear Belial's . As a result of AIB's investigation, Belial chastised Kei for his failure to secure all eight Capsules from Riku and the vulnerability of exposing their hideout, forcing him to utilize them within his Sturm Organ as Pedanium Zetton. Although Zero managed to seal the entrance to Belial's dimension, he easily escaped sometime later as he raced towards Earth and absorbed Geed as the Belial Fusion Beast Chimeraberus. Belial's attempt to completely absorb his son while winning him over with illusions failed due to Zero, Laiha and King's intervention, allowing Geed to escape, obtain King's Ultra Capsule and destroy Chimeraberus with his new Royal Mega Master form. Despite his apparent death, Belial lived on, having chosen a young woman named Arie Ishikari as his host to keep tabs on Kei until his Sturm Organ was ready for him to take as his own. Abandoning his host and Kei, having incorporated the Sturm Organ into his body to siphon King's essence to use a power source, Belial uses the Dark Lugiel and Alien Empira Monster Capsules to assume his Atrocious form. While his ability to absorb King's power is severed, Belial manages to overwhelm his opposition before Geed manages to drag his father into a dimensional void and, making a final attempt to reason with his father after seeing his memories. Unfortunately as Belial was too focused on his grudges, Geed was forced to kill in a beam struggle. His death in the final episode sealed his fate to remain spiritually trapped in the dimensional void whereas Geed escaped not long after.

Parallel Isotope
During the events of Ultra Galaxy Fight, Absolute Tartarus' tampering with the timeline allows him to create a Parallel Isotope of Ultraman Belial. In the English dub, he is voiced by Jack Merluzzi.

In The Absolute Conspiracy, Tartarus travel into the past during the events of Ultimate Wars where he implored a young Belial into joining The Kingdom by promising him to alter his impending death in the future. By taking up the offer, events leading to his mutation into Reionics is averted, hence the Parallel Isotope Belial remains in Early Style and is granted the Absolute Particles that allow him to be as strong as the Absolutians. Joined by a fellow Parallel Ultra, Tregear, the two assisted Tartarus in defeating the Ultra Brothers on Satellite Golgotha and securing Yullian's kidnapping by incapacitating the New Generation Heroes. In The Destined Crossroad however, after failing to stop the Ultras from rescuing Yullian and refusing Geed's plea to understand his pain, a disillusioned Belial deserted The Kingdom in order to obtain power on his own merits.

Legacy
Ultraman Geed The Movie (2018): Belial was mentioned in a passing by Airu Higa when explaining the origin of Giga Battle Nizer, which she revealed as a simultaneous/accidental creation by the Kushia People while creating the Giga Finalizer.
Ultraman R/B (2018): Representing the element of darkness, Belial's R/B Crystal was obtained from Planet Sanja by the Ultraman brothers, Rosso and Blu. In addition to its massive power, it was meant to be used with Ultraman Crystal but they failed to realize its power due to their lack of synchronization with their little sister, Saki. She would keep the Crystal for 13 centuries after their deaths and eventually relinquish it to the Minato brothers, which they finally used to combine into Ultraman R/B.
Ultraman R/B The Movie (2019): During his stay in the Minato family's household area, Riku brought up his origin and association to Belial towards Asahi while the latter was questioning her own existence.
Ultra Galaxy Fight: New Generation Heroes (2019): The emotional trauma from being possessed by Belial caused Zero to have his own Darkness Copy modeled after Zero Darkness. The doppelganger exhibits different abilities (Wide Zero Shot and energy bullets) and was defeated by Ultraman R/B, later Zero Beyond after his brief revival by Tregear.
Ultraman Taiga (2019): After Belial's death, his DNA factor had been sold in Villain Guild's black market dealings. An Alien Chibull named Mabuze used Belial's DNA on two occasions, first synthesizing a Skull Gomora with the DNA Factors of a Red King and a Gomora and then using Belial's DNA by itself to creating a clone known as Imit-Ultraman Belial.
Ultraman Z (2020): Because of his wounds from sustaining various fights in the past, several of Belial's remains scattered into  in various dimensions, turning monsters into rampant while Celebro used them for his own ends. On the other hand, Belial was cloned through Geed's DNA into the Beliarok, a sentient weapon which usually supported Haruki and Z in their subsequent battles.

Profile
Height: 55 m (4,000 m as Belyudra, 300 m as Arch Belial, Unknown as Kaiser Darkness, 49 m for Zero Darkness, 58 m as Chimeraberus)
Weight: 60,000 t ("Immeasurable" as Belyudra, 66,000 t with the Belial Mantle, 300,000 t as Arch Belial, Unknown as Kaiser Darkness, 35,000 t as Zero Darkness, 69,000 t as Chimeraberus 55,000 t as Atrocious)
Birthplace: Nebula M78, the Land of Light (Monster Graveyard for Belyudra/Kaiser Belial/Zero Darkness, Esmeralda Space Zone for Arch Belial)
Year Debut: 2009
First Appearance: Mega Monster Battle: Ultra Galaxy (2009)
Family structure:
Son: Ultraman Geed

Description
According to the Amazon Japan's description: "The dark Ultra Warrior that was born from the Land of Light. Having abandoned the heart of an Ultra Warrior, he sought for the strongest power in the universe."

Features and weapons
: A Reionics himself, Belial's main weapon is the Giga Battle Nizer, which allows him to contain and control 100 monsters at once, compared to regular and Neo Battle Nizers which are limited to three monsters. This weapon however became one of the main factors of his downfall when Rei hijacked it through his Neo Battle Nizer. Prior to Reibatos' destruction, Belial managed to reclaim the device with the former played his part in fixing it. Unlike normal Battle Nizers used by Reionics, this particular device was a simultaneous creation resulted by the people of Planet Kushia while creating the Giga Finalizer.
: While taking the mantle of Kaiser Belial, he can elongate a set of reddish talons to slash at opponents or infect them with his  to corrode their free will and serve him. These were mainly used to compensate the loss of his Giga Battle Nizer.
: A giant bomb summoned by the Giga Battle Nizer, which helped Belial to initiate Crisis Impact and set forth the motion of Ultraman Geed.
: A device which allows Belial to scan Monster Capsules and perform . Created by Ultraman Hikari alongside the Ultra Capsules, they were stolen by Kei sometime after the Crisis Impact.
: A set of capsules which contains the essence of an Ultra Monster, usually one recently destroyed with its essence infused into Hikari's Ultra Capsules. Belial's nature as a Reionics allows him to empower the Monster Capsules, normally channeling his power through Kei but can directly use them to summon a monster on invoke a Fusion Rise. Upon his destruction as Chimeraberus, Belial's capsules went scattered as AIB try to collect them before they fell into the hands of invaders.
It was one of Belial's scattered capsules and retrieved by AIB before Kei (later Belial) reclaim them.
It was one of Belial's scattered capsules and retrieved by AIB before Kei (later Belial) reclaim them.
: The conversion organ of the Alien Sturm race, which allows them to polarize the flow and nature of whatever energy they absorb. Having had Kei absorb the energies of the Ultra Capsules, Belial bid his time before ripping out the Sturm Organ at the peak of its power and incorporated it into his body for his endgame. Through said organ, he is capable of spreading  to draw Ultraman King's  and empower himself as Ultraman Belial Atrocious.

Forms, powers and abilities
As a Reionics, a being infused with the DNA of the Raybrad, Belial usually relies upon the use of brute strength and his Giga Battle Nizer which he uses to subjugate monsters to fight for him. The Absolute Conspiracy revealed that his lightning bolt attacks and Deathcium Rays were all inherited features from his original Early Style form.

During the events of Revenge of Belial, the right side of his face scarred at the moment of Belyudra's destruction. With the exception of the  he wears and his claws reddened, Belial's abilities are mostly the same. By the time Belial was resurrected at the end of Ultra Zero Fight, his trademark scar completely healed.

The rest of his forms includes:
: Belial's pre-corruption form, whose appearance is simply that of a normal Ultra Warrior with a silver body and red linings. In addition to retaining his Deathcium Ray, Belial is presented merciless fighter who would also execute unarmed opponents. This form returned in the final episode of Ultraman Geed during Riku's attempt to reason with his father, where he managed to purge Raybrad's grudge from Belial's spiritual representation. When Tartarus tampered with the Land of Light's past, he created a Parallel Isotope of past Belial without actually affecting the real timeline. This Belial was remained in Early Style, as his contract with Raybrad was prevented and has memories of his original self. In place of Reionics powers, Tartarus compensated this with his Absolutian powers, allowing Belial to become stronger than even the present day Ultra Brothers.
: See here
: A form Belial assumed in the movie Revenge of Belial, after absorbing all of the emeralds he stole from Planet Esmeralda to become a 300 meter tall reptilian monster. According to Super Complete Works magazine, had Belial successfully killed the rebels of his regime, he would proceed to go to the Land of Light and destroy the Ultras in this form.
: Appeared in Ultra Zero Fight 2, the vengeful spirit of Ultraman Belial possessed the Armored Darkness as his own. Here, Belial appeared wearing the armour, but having removed the sentient armour's helmet.
: Shortly after Zero stabbed Kaiser Darkness, Belial's essence possess Zero and took his rival's body as his own. With victory in his grasp, he was about to lead the Darkness Five in a conquest to rule the galaxy until Zero expelled Belial with Shining Ultraman Zero.

: Accessed with the use of King Joe and the Galactron Capsules, his finisher being . Although an original character in Ultraman Fusion Fight! Capsule Yugo, this fusion made its appearance in Ultraman Festival 2017 and utilized by Ultraman Belial during a fight against the Ultra Warriors.
: A Fusion Rise of Ultraman Belial, which accessed through the use of Five King and Zogu (Second Form)'s Monster Capsules. Aside from gaining a pair of wings, Belial can exert a portion of Gan-Q's power to absorb his son, Ultraman Geed.
: Belial's  form, using the Dark Lugiel and Alien Empera Monster Capsules in conjunction with the Sturm Organ he assimilated into his body. He uses the Sturm Organ to spread out the Carellen Element to draw Ultraman King's scattered essence and convert it into energy to increase his power.

Human host

Arie Ishikari

 is a 28 year old aspiring nonfiction writer who approaches things from a non-biased point of view. She had been researching Kei's background ever since his rise to popularity as a famous writer.

She provided Kei refuge in exchange of her writing the man's biography, remained adamant of that even after witnessing Kei fighting the Ultramen and his attempt to kill her in his weakened state, becoming his willing accomplice as a result. Despite Arie's undying loyalty and love towards him, she was quickly killed by Kei once she served his purpose in retrieving the Alien Empera and Dark Lugiel Capsules. After Kei's final battle with Geed, Arie revealed to have survive her assassination, along with the fact that she was possessed by Ultraman Belial ever since his defeat as Chimeraberus. Tearing the Sturm Organ from Kei, Belial used it to revive himself before abandoning Arie's body. Once Belial was free of Arie, the young author collapsed and her fate was left unknown.

She is named after Victorian era author/novelist Mary Shelley.

The late reveal of Arie as Belial's host was made intentional by director Sakamoto to mislead the audience into believing that the evil Ultra had died while seemingly giving the role of the main antagonist to Kei Fukuide. Arie was a late addition by Koichi Sakamoto, as her debut episode by Otsuichi was never meant to feature said character. In the original planning, director Takesue envisioned a doppelganger of Riku Asakura (wearing a mask) plots to revive Belial but decided to use Arie for this after realizing that the first one was difficult to be written in the story. Arie is written by Otsuichi as a foil to Donshine, where both are Showa Era-esque characters with relation to their respective partners (Kei and Riku).

In other media

Variety show
Ultraman Belial appeared on the late night variety program Mecha-Mecha Iketeru! that aired on December 12, 2009, as part of cross-promotion with Mega Monster Battle: Ultra Galaxy. In this segment, Ultraman Belial appeared and posed questions to the monster army including Alien Pressure, a character portrayed by Takashi Okamura, based on the similarly named alien of Ultraman Leo. When Pressure provokes Belial about his personal life, his voice actor Hiroyuki Miyasako dashed in and kicked the former out in retaliation.
Kaiser Belial, Zero and the Ultra Brothers made their appearance in the NHK program MUSIC JAPAN in a cross-promotion with Ultraman Zero: The Revenge of Belial.

Drama
In the 2011 Ultra Series drama Ultra Zone, Belyudra appeared in the mini-corner of episode 2 alongside Giga Khimaira, forming the duo . He reappeared in the eyecatch of episode 11, as shown decorating the Tokyo Tower in a similar manner to a Christmas tree.

Novel
Ultraman Belial appeared in the serial novel Another Genesis as its main antagonist. In Chapter 1, Belial was imprisoned within the Land of Light for his crimes. After breaking free, this created an explosion that destroyed the planet. Soon in Chapter 9, Ultraman, a survivor of the planet's destruction, revealed to have its resemblance to Belial through unknown means.

Video games
One month after the release of Ultraman Zero: The Revenge of Belial, the Kaiju Busters Powered Nintendo game was released in 2011. Kaiser Belial is portrayed as one of the boss characters.
In the arcade release of Tank! Tank! Tank!, Kaiser Belial is featured as one of the antagonists alongside Mecha Gomora and Tyrant.
The arcade game Mega Monster Rush: Ultra Frontier featured Belial and the Darkness Five as playable characters starting from June 2014. In said game, Belial is shown to have regained his Giga Battle Nizer, due to his attacks being associated with said weapon.
Ultraman Belial is one of the playable characters in the 2016 arcade game, Ultraman Fusion Fight. During its release in the Asia, the game's English dub had the character voiced by Redman comic artist Matt Frank.
Ultraman Belial appears in the 14th level of City Shrouded in Shadow, fighting Taro, Zero, and the original Ultraman.
Ultraman Belial was made as an event-exclusive character in Ultraman:Be Ultra, a mobile game based on the Ultraman manga. He is represented as an Ultraman Suit modeled after his likeness.

Commercial
Belial appeared in a PSA commercial for theater manners during the screening of Mega Monster Battle: Ultra Galaxy, where he was portrayed as a bad example to the viewers before being fired by multiple Ultras.

Music video
Ultraman Belial and other Ultra Warriors, as well as Ultimate Force Zero appeared in Girl Next Door's music video Unmei no Shizuku ~Destiny's star~, as the song was used as the ending theme for Ultraman Zero: The Revenge of Belial.

Internet

During the promotion of Mega Monster Battle: Ultra Galaxy, Tsuburaya collaborated with Niconico's website, publishing Belial's personal "diary" that recorded his days of being imprisoned. Said diary mentioned that he was restrained for 457,542 years and four days before he was released by Alien Zarab.
Ultraman Belial (as Kaiser Belial) is shown to be running his own websites, and goes so far by creating his own personal emojis ("(▼皿▼)" for Belial and "(▼ω▼ﾒ)" for Kaiser Belial). Both accounts, however, were closed as of December 2011 due to the intrusion of a mysterious spaceship, making way for the 2012 Ultra Series movie, Ultraman Saga.
Aside from Belial and his cohorts, pictures of other Ultra Warriors were pixelated. According to Belial, the website itself is updated by Darkgone, his staff officer in the Belial Galactic Empire.
His second website is a Twitter account, on which he claimed that he was posting Tweets by using a King Joe from the Monster Graveyard and modifying it into his personal computer. He also indirectly mentioned other franchises in Japan such as the anime Squid Girl and the video games Pokémon Black and White and Monster Hunter Portable 3rd.

Drama CD
Ultraman Belial appears at the end of the Drama CD Ultra Kaijoshi, wishing to recruit several monsters in the Monster Graveyard as his legions but failed.

Stage shows
Ultraman Festival Live stages:
2016: Belial was among the revived enemies that were brought forth by Alien Baltan, alongside Dark Lugiel and Greeza. Wielding the Armored Darkness' Darkness Broad, he fought against Luna-Miracle Zero and was defeated by the latter's Ultra Zero Lance.
2017: In the midst of the Dark Ultra Warrior attacks, Belial was confronted by Zero under the suspicion of being their leader, which he denied. After Ultra Dark Killer's defeat, Belial unveiled himself by Fusion Rise into King Galactron and attacked them before being defeated by the combined forces of Ultraseven X, Shining Ultraman Zero and Ultraman Geed Acro Smasher.
Alongside Evil Tiga, Camearra, Dark Zagi and Juggler, Belial was reborn as a human-like individual for the 2019 stage play of Darkness Heels the Live.

Other

Reception
Like many actors of the Ultra Series, including that of actors/voice actors of Ultra Warriors, comedian Hiroyuki Miyasako felt delighted when he was offered with the role of Ultraman Belial, remembering his childhood watching the Ultra Series, although he did express his confusion about his character being a villain despite Belial's status as an Ultra Warrior. Director Koichi Sakamoto praised Miyasako for his good voice of the character and because of him, Belial's approach was completed without any signs of disturbances. Mamoru Miyano, Ultraman Zero's voice actor, stated that both Belial and Zero are the main center of attraction for the movie and was impressed with Miyasako's work, as the two performed the voiceovers of their characters despite having little time to interact with each other.

Having obtained permission from Tsuburaya Productions, Japanese theater website Cinema Today "interviewed" Ultraman Belial himself, who stated that he viewed the Japanese citizens as his "servants" while Ultraman King was a figure that he feared. In several of the unanswered questions, he only told the interviewer to watch Mega Monster Battle: Ultra Galaxy to get the answer.

In the Ultra Series' 45th anniversary, Ultraman Belial (as Kaiser Belial) scored 5th place in an Ultra Hero popularity ranking, with his rival Zero placed at number 1.

Notes

References
Published materials

 
 
 
 
 
 

 

References

External links
Ultraman Belial in Tsuburaya Productions' English Website
The Strongest Room of Kaiser Belial - Collaboration with Nico Nico Douga
Characters in Ultraman Zero: The Revenge of Belial

Belial
Extraterrestrial supervillains
Television characters introduced in 2009
Fictional characters with superhuman strength
Fictional defectors
Fictional dictators
Fictional emperors and empresses
Fictional genocide perpetrators
Fictional ghosts
Fictional giants
Fictional mass murderers
Fictional soldiers
Fictional war veterans
Fictional warlords
Galactic emperors
Male characters in film
Male characters in television
Television supervillains